Xposed is the third studio album by Chinese singer G.E.M., released on July 5, 2012, by Hummingbird Music.

Track listing

References 

2012 albums
G.E.M. albums
Mandopop albums
Cantopop albums